Peru has many languages in use. One of its official languages, Spanish, has been in the country since it began being taught in the time of José Pardo instead of the country's Native languages, especially the languages in the Andes. In the beginning of the 21st century, it was estimated that in this multilingual country, about 50 very different and popular languages are spoken: which reduces to 44 languages if dialects are considered variants of the same language. The majority of these languages are Indigenous, but the most common language is Spanish, the main language that about 94.4% of the population speaks. Spanish is followed by the country's Indigenous languages, especially all types of Quechua (11.1% combined) and Aymara (1.4%), who also have co-official status according to Article 48 of the Constitution of Peru, as well as the languages of the Amazon and the Peruvian Sign Language. In urban areas of the country, especially the coastal region, most people are monolingual and only speak Spanish, while in many rural areas of the country, especially in the Amazon, multilingual populations are prevalent.

Linguistic Situation 
According to Peter Landerman, the Jesuits translated fragments of Christian scriptures into about 150 Indigenous languages of the Peruvian Amazon area. Of those, about 60 survive today.

Linguistic Legislation 
At the political level, Spanish is the official language of Peru and, in areas where they are common, Quechua, Aymara,  and some other Indigenous languages are also the official language.

Number of Speakers 
In Peru, there are close to 40 languages within the Amazon Rainforest which are usually grouped into 17 families and divide into close to 120 recognizable local varieties.

Population by Native Language:

Indigenous Languages 
Indigenous languages of Peru are primarily located in the central Andes and the Amazon rain forest. Many northern Andes languages were located along the northern coast and the northern Andes, but most of them died in the 19th century. The only Native languages in the Andes that are common are Quechua, Aymara, Jaqaru, and Kawki; while in the Amazon region, there is an abundance of various Native languages. In the Amazon, the most common languages are Asháninka and Aguaruna. There are more than 15 defined linguistic families in Peru's territory and another 15 or more languages that are isolated or not classified.

The actual number of languages in Peru could have exceeded 300. Some authors even say that there could have been 700 languages. However, since the conquering of Latin America by Spain and after Peru's independence, the disappearance of Indigenous people (because of conquest and mixing of languages) and discrimination against Indigenous languages because of mixed populations, as well as the Peruvian government (which imposed Spanish), led to the number of Indigenous languages dropping to fewer than 150. Today the number of Indigenous languages is still large, but much less than it used to be. The following list shows the languages spoken today in Peru and those that went extinct since the 20th century (shown in italics).

Classification 
The Indigenous languages of Peru belong to more than 15 language families, and some isolated or unclassified languages, which are extinct today (represented in the table as †), are also documented to more than 15 languages. The following list organizes more than 95 languages within existing and extinct languages:

Quechua 
Quechua is the second language of Peru, in terms of number of speakers. It is the official language in areas where it is the dominant language, even though from a linguistic point of view, it's a family of related languages. (Ethnologue assigns separate language codes to more than 25 varieties of Quechua in Peru.)

Aymara 
Aymara has the third largest number of speakers within Peru, with about half a million speakers in the country. It is most common in the southern part of the country, in parts of Puno, Moquegua, and Tacna.

Amazonian Languages 
The rest of the Indigenous languages of Peru have more than 105 thousand speakers in total, and are located mostly in the east and north part of the country, specifically in Loreto, Madre de Dios, and Ucayali. The northern part of Peru (Loreto) is probably the most diverse part of the country from a linguistic standpoint since that part contains an abundance of the small families of languages and isolated languages.

In northern Peru, there are 5 small families of languages: Cahuapana, Jívara, Zápara, Peba-yagua, and Bora-witoto. These families of languages are mostly spoken in Loreto, but also in areas connected to Brazil, Colombia, and Ecuador. The majority of these groups were destroyed in the "Rubber Boom" at the beginning of the 20th century. In the Putumayo river region, the population fell from 50 thousand to between 7-10 thousand within the first decade of the 20th century.

In the Ucayali area, Pano languages are most common, while in the high jungle of the Ucayali River basin the southern Arahuaca languages are most common.

In the Peruvian Amazon over forty languages, which are usually grouped into 14 families and diversifying about 120 recognizable local varieties are spoken.

Other Minority Languages 
A foreign language of a territory is a language whose historical origin is known and falls outside of said that territory and arrived in this territory through conquest, immigration, or colonization.

Sign Language 
The sign language of Peru (Peruvian Sign Language) is used by the deaf community in the country. The 2007 census did not include any questions about the LSP, but this was corrected in 2017.

Other Foreign Languages 
In addition to Spanish, which is the most common foreign language, there exist other languages that also did not originate in Peru, and are spoken due to the results of migration.

While it is true that there are many foreign colonies in Peru, the majority of these abandoned their original language. Within the first communities of immigrants lived people from Japan, China, and in smaller amounts people from Germany (central jungle in Pozuzo and Oxapampa), Italy (urban areas of Lima and Arequipa), and Arabic and Hindi (Urdu) areas. These last two are due to the recent waves of immigrants from Palestine and Pakistan. French is also a language that is rooted in Loreto due to a campaign by the French Alliance. French was well received in the Peruvian population, especially in Iquiteña. Lately English has also had a big influence due to the number of tourists and American/British residence. Portuguese is also used in areas like Ucayali, Loreto, and Madre de Dios. These areas border Brazil, whose official language is Portuguese.

Use in government
Historically name registers only captured Spanish or Western-inspired names. In 2019 the government began encouraging the use of Indigenous names in name registers.

See also 
 Demographics of Peru
 Quechuan and Aymaran spelling shift

References

Bibliography 

 Adelaar, Willem F. H.; & Muysken, Pieter C. (2004): The languages of the Andes. Cambridge language surveys. Cambridge University Press. 
 Dixon & Alexandra Y. Aikhenvald (eds.) (1999): The Amazonian languages. Cambridge: Cambridge University Press, .

External links
 Resonancias.org –  Aboriginal languages of Peru
  Center of Peruvian Studies
 Mucha-suerte.com – ペルー トルヒージョ 2003年12月31日(水)
 Linguistic Map of Peru
 Resonancias.org – Indigenous Languages of Peru.
 Center of Peruvian Investigation
 Summer Language Institute - Perú